TAM Transportes Aéreos Regionais Flight 402 was a scheduled domestic flight from São Paulo–Congonhas International Airport in São Paulo, Brazil to Recife International Airport in Recife via Santos Dumont Airport in Rio de Janeiro. On 31 October 1996, at 8:27 (UTC-2), the starboard engine of the Fokker 100 operating the route reversed thrust while the aircraft was climbing away from the runway at Congonhas. The aircraft stalled and rolled beyond control to the right, then struck two buildings and crashed into several houses in a heavily populated area only 25 seconds after takeoff. All 95 people on board were killed, as well as another 4 on the ground. It is the fourth deadliest accident in Brazilian aviation history, the second at the time. It is also the deadliest aviation accident involving a Fokker 100.

Aircraft
The aircraft involved was a Fokker 100 with the registration PT-MRK. The aircraft made its first flight on 8 February 1993 and was acquired second-hand by TAM Transportes Aéreos Regionais in April 1995; it had accumulated more than 8,000 flying hours. It wore a special promotional blue livery on its fuselage with the inscription "Number 1", in reference to TAM being awarded "Regional Airline of the Year" by Air Transport World magazine.

Crew 
The Captain was 35-year-old José Antonio Moreno, who had more than 9,000 hours of flight experience, including 3,000 hours on the Fokker 100. The first officer was 27-year-old Ricardo Luis Gomes, who had 4,000 flight hours, with 160 of them on the Fokker 100. There were also five flight attendants on board.

Accident

The Fokker 100 aircraft incorporates a safety system to deal with an accidental deployment of a thrust reverser on take-off or when in flight; the system automatically moves the thrust control of the affected Rolls-Royce Tay 650-15 engine to reduce power, the aeroplane then being capable of climbing out safely on the full power of the one unaffected engine, or of maintaining normal flight at reduced power. In addition, a micro-switch, activated by the aircraft's main landing gear leaving the ground, disables the thrust reverser operating circuitry, preventing inadvertent operation of the thrust reverser in flight.

As the aircraft lifted off the runway on the accident flight with both engines at full power, a faulty switch in conjunction with a possible short circuit caused the right engine's thrust reverser to deploy.  The imbalance of power resulted in the aircraft rolling and veering to the right as it was climbing away from the runway. The safety system automatically cut the power to the engine with the malfunctioning thrust reverser. There was no alarm or other indication in the cockpit to indicate that a thrust reverser had been accidentally deployed. The crew had no way of knowing what the true problem was. The copilot, seeing the right engine power lever automatically move to the closed position, thought that the lever had slipped back due to a problem with the autothrottle system and pushed it back to the full power position alongside the left engine throttle lever. Once again, the automatic safety system closed the right engine throttle and the captain, who was conducting the takeoff, called for the autothrottle system to be switched off.  After switching off the system, the copilot again pushed the right engine power lever fully forward and forcefully held it there.

The safety system cable, responsible for pulling the power lever to the idle position, was no longer able to withstand the physical strain of being pulled one way by the actuator, while the copilot forced it the other way by pushing the throttle lever to the fully open position — the cable soon parted at a maintenance connection. With the lever no longer restrained by the safety system, the copilot continued to hold the right throttle fully open. The combination of the right engine at full thrust in reverse and the left engine still at normal forward take-off thrust caused the aircraft to roll violently to the right and descend into the ground.

Investigation 
In the subsequent investigation it was discovered that the flight crew had not been trained for such an occurrence as the aircraft's manufacturer, Fokker, had judged the failure mode to be so remote a possibility that training for recovery was not necessary.

Dramatization 
The crash was featured in the 15th season of the television documentary series Mayday in an episode titled "Carnage in São Paulo".

See also

Lauda Air Flight 004, an accident involving in-flight thrust reverser deployment.
Pacific Western Airlines Flight 314, an accident involving in-flight thrust reverser deployment.
TAROM Flight 371, an accident which was caused by Auto-throttle failure.
Sriwijaya Air Flight 182, an accident that was caused by Auto-throttle failure after take off.

References

External links
 Final Report
 Final Report 
 
 

Airliner accidents and incidents caused by mechanical failure
Aviation accidents and incidents in 1996
Aviation accidents and incidents in Brazil
Accidents and incidents involving the Fokker 100
TAM Airlines accidents and incidents
1996 in Brazil
October 1996 events in South America